The Nordic Cross Country Championships is an annual international cross country running competition that is contested between the Nordic countries. The championships are generally held in mid-November and the host nation rotates every year between the Nordic countries.

Established in 1997, the championships comprises four separate races: the men's senior and junior competitions (9 kilometres and 6 km respectively), and a senior and junior competition for women (7.5 km and 4.5 km). The women's senior race was previously the same length as the junior race, but this was modified in 2008. The distances are approximate and vary slightly from year to year depending on the course.

In addition to the individual competitions, each race doubles as a team competition in which the finishing positions of the top three athletes from each country are combined, with the lowest scoring national team winning. The performances of the top four athletes are used for the men's senior team race.

Editions

Past medalists

Men's senior

Men's junior

Women's senior

Women's junior

See also
European Cross Country Championships
IAAF World Cross Country Championships
Nordic Council

References
General
Nordic Cross Country Championships. GBR Athletics. Retrieved on 2009-11-14.
Specific

External links
World Cross Country Championships homepage from IAAF
Additional race summaries: 2003, 2005, 2010

Cross country running competitions
Recurring sporting events established in 1997
Athletics team events
Inter-Nordic sports competitions
1997 establishments in Europe